Greatest Hits is the first compilation album by American country music artist Mark Chesnutt. It features ten hits from his first four studio albums: 1990's Too Cold at Home, 1992's Longnecks & Short Stories, 1993's Almost Goodbye, and 1994's What a Way to Live, as well as the newly recorded tracks "It's a Little Too Late" and "Let It Rain". Both of these tracks were released as singles in 1996, peaking at #1 and #8, respectively, on the Hot Country Songs charts. The album itself earned RIAA platinum certification.

Track listing

Personnel
The following musicians performed on the new tracks "It's a Little Too Late" and "Let It Rain".
 Eddie Bayers - drums
 Tim Broussard - diatonic accordion
 Larry Byrom - electric guitar
 Mark Chesnutt - lead vocals 
 Stuart Duncan - fiddle
 Liana Manis - background vocals
 Michael Rhodes - bass guitar
 Matt Rollings - piano
 Brent Rowan - electric guitar
 Robby Turner - steel guitar
 Biff Watson - acoustic guitar
 Curtis Young - background vocals

Chart performance

References

Further reading
 

1996 greatest hits albums
Mark Chesnutt albums
Decca Records compilation albums